Mark W. Tatge is an American journalist, author, and college professor. He was a senior editor at Forbes magazine's Midwest Bureau, a staff reporter at The Wall Street Journal, an investigative reporter in the Statehouse Bureau of Cleveland's The Plain Dealer, and is the 2014 recipient of the Baldwin Fellowship at University of South Carolina.

Tatge taught journalism at DePauw University and Ohio University's E. W. Scripps School of Journalism and at University of South Carolina. He also worked as an adjunct professor at Northwestern University’s Medill School of Journalism, where he taught graduate journalism students about business, economics and finance.

In 2010, Tatge published his first book, The New York Times Reader: Business and Economics.

Early life
Mark Tatge was born in Chicago, the descendant of German and Irish immigrants who grew up on the north side of Chicago in the Portage Park neighborhood. Tatge attended Catholic schools, including St. Viator High School in suburban Arlington Heights, Ill.

Tatge is a past Kiplinger Fellow in Public Affairs Reporting at Ohio State University where he completed his master's degree in journalism. Upon graduation, Tatge embarked upon a career in business journalism. Tatge went on to complete his MBA at Ohio University. He holds a bachelor's degree from Western Illinois University.

Career
Tatge has written about corporate misdeeds, starting with his coverage of the savings and loan scandal in Colorado Savings and loan crisis during the 1980s. Tatge chronicled how lax federal regulations allowed bank executives to speculate on land deals with depositors' money. The funny money deals sank Silverado Banking. The thrift collapsed in 1988, costing taxpayers $1.3 billion. Tatge spent eight years as the Cleveland Plain Dealer'''s statehouse investigative reporter uncovering corruption in state government. Tatge's investigation into corruption at the Ohio Department of Insurance, entitled "Secrets of the Deal," was twice nominated for a Pulitzer Prize.

Tatge was awarded a visiting professorship at Ohio University endowed by the foundation established by the E.W. Scripps Co., beginning in 2008.

In 2011, Tatge was named Eugene S. Pulliam Distinguished Visiting Professor of Journalism at DePauw University.

In 2014, Tatge was awarded the Baldwin Business and Financial Graduate Fellowship at the University of South Carolina.

Tatge is the author of The New York Times Reader: Business and Economics, He is also a contributing editor to: The Big Chill: Investigative Reporting in the Current Media Environment''.

References

External links
Mark Tatge Web site

Living people
American newspaper journalists
American investigative journalists
American editors
American male bloggers
American bloggers
1965 births
Ohio University faculty
Ohio State University School of Communication alumni
Ohio University alumni
Northwestern University staff
Western Illinois University alumni
University of Wisconsin–Madison School of Journalism & Mass Communication alumni
The Denver Post people
DePauw University faculty
21st-century American non-fiction writers